The Monuments are five classic cycle races generally considered to be the oldest, hardest and most prestigious one-day events in men's road cycling.
They each have a long history and specific individual characteristics. They are currently the one-day races in which most points can be earned in the UCI World Tour.

List of monuments
The five monuments are:
  Milan–San Remo – the first major Classic of the year, its Italian name is La Primavera (the spring), because it is held in late March. First run in 1907, it is considered the sprinter's classic. This race is particularly long (ca. ) though mostly flat along the Ligurian coast, enabling sprinters to compete.
  Tour of Flanders – the Ronde van Vlaanderen in Dutch, the first of the Cobbled classics, is raced every first Sunday of April. It was first held in 1913, making it the youngest of the five Monuments. Notable for the narrow short hills (hellingen) in the Flemish Ardennes, usually steep and cobbled, the route forces the best riders to continually fight for space at the front. The course changes slightly every year: since 2017  the race has started in Antwerp and since 2012 has finished in Oudenaarde.
  Paris–Roubaix – the Queen of the Classics or l'Enfer du Nord ("The Hell of the North") is raced traditionally one week after the Tour of Flanders and is the last of the cobbled races. It was first organized in 1896. Its decisive sites are the many long sections of pavé (roads of cobblestones) making it the most unpleasant one-day race. It is considered by many to be the most heroic one-day cycling event of the year. The race finishes on the iconic Roubaix Velodrome.  At the end of the race, riders are usually covered in dirt and mud in what is considered one of the most brutal tests of mental and physical endurance in all of cycling.  
  Liège–Bastogne–Liège – held in late April. La Doyenne, the oldest Classic, is the last of the Ardennes classics and usually the last of the spring races. It was first organized in 1892 as an amateur event; a professional edition followed in 1894. It is a long and arduous race notable for its many sharp hills in the Ardennes and uphill finish in the industrial suburbs of Liège, favouring climbers and even grand tour specialists.
  Giro di Lombardia – the Autumn Classic or the Race of the Falling Leaves, is held in October or late September. Initially organized as Milano–Milano in 1905, it was called the Giro di Lombardia (Tour of Lombardy) in 1907 and Il Lombardia in 2012. It is notable for its hilly and varied course around Lake Como. It is often won by climbers with a strong sprint finish.

Monuments winners

Statistics

Most monuments wins
Only three riders have won all five monument races during their careers: Rik Van Looy, Eddy Merckx and Roger De Vlaeminck, all three Belgians, and only Eddy Merckx won each of them more than once.

Six riders won four different monuments. With victories in all the other monuments, Sean Kelly almost joined the top group, finishing second in the Tour of Flanders on three occasions (1984, 1986 and 1987). Dutch rider Hennie Kuiper won each monument except Liège–Bastogne–Liège, in which he finished second in 1980. Frenchman Louison Bobet also won all but Liège–Bastogne–Liège. Belgian rider Fred De Bruyne came close as well, finishing second in the Giro di Lombardia in 1955 and winning the other four races during his career. Germain Derycke also won four, all except the Giro di Lombardia. Philippe Gilbert is the most recent rider to win four different monuments, all except Milan–San Remo, in which he finished third twice. 21 riders have won at least five monuments in their career.

Riders in blue are still active. Number of wins in gold indicates the current record holder(s).

Winners by nationality

Winners of three monuments in a single year
Only Eddy Merckx has been able to win three monuments in a single year – and he did it four times:

Winners of two monuments in a single year
25 different riders (including Eddy Merckx) have managed to win two Monuments in the same year. The most common "double" consists of the two cobbled classics (Tour of Flanders and Paris–Roubaix), which have been won by the same rider in the same year on 12 occasions. The Italian "double" (Milan–San Remo and Giro di Lombardia) has been achieved 11 times (including Merckx in 1971 and 1972). Only Merckx has won the combinations Milan–San Remo/Tour of Flanders and Tour of Flanders/Liège–Bastogne–Liège, when he won all three Monuments in 1969 and 1975.

Women's events
Both Belgian 'monuments' – The Tour of Flanders and Liège–Bastogne–Liège Femmes – organise women's events on the same day and partly the same course as the men's events. A women's version of Milan–San Remo, named Primavera Rosa, was initiated in 1999, but cancelled after 2005. The first edition of Paris–Roubaix Femmes took place in October 2021, after the 2020 edition was cancelled due to the COVID-19 pandemic. The 2021 race was won by Lizzie Deignan, who became the first women's rider to win a classic triple crown of the three existing monuments, having won 'Ronde van Vlaanderen' in 2016, and Liege-Bastogne-Liege in 2020.

Winners

Most monuments wins

Winners by nationality

Notes

References

+